Cigale is a divertissement-ballet in two acts by Jules Massenet to a scenario by Henri Cain. It was composed in Égreville during the summer of 1902, first published by Heugel in 1903 and first performed at the Opéra-Comique in Paris on 4 February 1904.

The story is inspired by Jean de la Fontaine's fable La cigale et la fourmi (a version of The Ant and the Grasshopper), and portrays "Cigale" (Cicada) as a charitable young woman who takes pity on "La Pauvrette" (The Poor Girl) and gives away her meager purse, bonnet and red umbrella. She is then ridiculed and taken advantage of by "Madame Fourmi" (Madam Ant), ticketed by "Le Garçon de Banque" (The Banker), and ravished by "Le Petit Ami" (The Boyfriend). Cigale, whose kindness and carefree nature leads her to lose what little she has, is refused shelter by Madame Fourmi and left to die in the snow at the close of the ballet. She ascends to heaven with the angels while La Pauvrette and Le Petit Ami run off together with her bonnet and red umbrella.

Cigale is rarely performed and is not part of the standard ballet repertory. The music, recorded by conductor Richard Bonynge and first available commercially in 1980, has been re-released on compact disc and digital media several times, most recently in 2020.

Characters
Cigale (Cicada)
La Pauvrette (The Poor Girl)
Le Petit Ami (The Boyfriend)
Madame Fourmi (Madam Ant)
Le Garçon de Banque (The Banker)

References

External links
 

Ballets by Jules Massenet
Ballets by Henri Cain
Works based on fables
1904 ballet premieres